Pottstown Municipal Airport  is a public use airport located in Montgomery County, Pennsylvania, United States. It is owned by the Borough of Pottstown and located two nautical miles (3.7 km) northwest of Pottstown's central business district.

Witmer's Aircraft Service offered a full suite of aircraft maintenance and repair services. Founded in 1992, Witmer's Aircraft Service was based at N47 for more than 10 years. Witmer's service is now operated by Pasquale Aviation.

History
In 1946 John Basco and Charles Novack purchased the land now occupied by the airport. Construction of the buildings began a year later, in 1947, and an Open House was held on September 26, 1948. The airport was originally referred to as Stowe Airport or Basco's Airport. A -long runway was built in 1961, and a parallel taxiway was built in 1965. During the 1980s a business park was added.

As part of the federal Airport Improvement Program, the airport began multiple projects over the last few years. In 2003 a new hangar was completed. The fuel farm tanks were refinished in December 2005. The apron and taxiway was repaved in the spring of 2007.

Facilities and aircraft 
It has one asphalt paved runway designated 8/26 which measures 2,704 by 75 feet (824 x 23 m).

For the 12-month period ending September 9, 2008, the airport had 24,687 aircraft operations, an average of 67 per day: 96% general aviation, 4% air taxi and <1% military. At that time there were 62 aircraft based at this airport: 97% single-engine and 3% multi-engine.

References

External links
 Pottstown Municipal Airport page at Borough of Pottstown website
 

Airports in Pennsylvania
Transportation buildings and structures in Montgomery County, Pennsylvania